National Highway 161B, commonly called NH 161B is a national highway in  India. It is a spur road of National Highway 61 through NH 161.  NH-161B traverses the state of Telangana in India.

Route 
Nizampet, Moodguntal, Narayanakhed, Manoor, Bellapur, Pulkurthi, Pipri, Ibrahimpur, Nyalkal, Athnoor, Dappur and terminating at Telangana/Karnataka border.

Junctions  
 
Terminal with National Highway 161 near Nizampet.

See also 
List of National Highways in India by highway number

List of National Highways in India by state

References

External links 
 NH 161B on OpenStreetMap

National highways in India
National Highways in Telangana